Haden Edward Knox (born January 22, 1937) is an American attorney and politician who served as the 49th Mayor of Charlotte, North Carolina from 1979 until 1983.

A native of Davidson, North Carolina, Knox is an alumnus of North Carolina State University and of Wake Forest University law school. Then a Democrat, Knox served in the North Carolina Senate for two terms (1971–74). He chaired the successful gubernatorial campaign of Jim Hunt in 1976. After being elected and re-elected mayor of Charlotte, Knox ran unsuccessfully for Governor of North Carolina, losing in the 1984 Democratic primary.  Thereafter, Knox switched parties and became a Republican. In 2004, Knox again crossed party lines and contributed money to John Edwards for President. In 2005, Knox switched parties again and became an Independent.

Presently, H. Edward Knox is a senior partner at Knox Law Center in Charlotte, North Carolina. Knox is also a principal owner and developer of Verdict Ridge Golf Club located in Denver, NC.

Notes

External links
Eddie Knox Papers at UNC Charlotte
Political Graveyard
City of Charlotte
Knox Law Center website

North Carolina state senators
North Carolina State University alumni
Wake Forest University alumni
Mayors of Charlotte, North Carolina
1937 births
Living people
North Carolina Democrats
North Carolina Republicans
People from Davidson, North Carolina